National Highway 965, commonly called NH 965 is a national highway in  India. It is a spur road of National Highway 65.  NH-965 traverses the state of Maharashtra in India.

Route 
Mohol, Pandharpur, Malshiras, Phaltan, Nira, Jejuri, Saswad near Pune, Alandi.

Junctions  
 
  Terminal near Mohol.
  near Nira.
  near Phaltan.
  Terminal near Alandi.

See also 
 List of National Highways in India by highway number
 List of National Highways in India by state

References

External links 

 NH 965 on OpenStreetMap

National highways in India
National Highways in Maharashtra